Ferdinand Porsche founded his company Dr. Ing. h.c. F. Porsche GmbH, Konstruktionen und Beratungen für Motoren und Fahrzeugbau (Porsche) in April 1931 in Stuttgart. The company established a numeric record of projects known as the Type List. Initially, the list was maintained by Karl Rabe. The first number was Type 7, chosen so that Wanderer-Werke AG did not realize they were the company's first customer. 

The first entries in the list are designs by Ferdinand Porsche before the company was founded and therefore these do not have a Type number. The designs up to number 287 are from the period leading into World War II when the company was based in Stuttgart. Type number 288 is the first of the Gmünd period where the company was relocated as part of the program to disperse companies outside big cities to prevent damage from the Allied strategic bombing campaign. In 1950 the company moved back to Stuttgart and makes a new start with Type 500, skipping a large part of the 400 range. Most numbers in this range are used up to the point where the initial designation for the 911 was chosen: number 901, skipping a large part of the 800 range. At this stage the practice of allocating a separate number to each component design (e.g. chassis, gearbox or engine) was abandoned and the 3-digit numbers are used for entire projects. At the start of the 900 range, the external customer projects receive a 4-digit number. More recently many new models have received alpha-numeric codes to fit with the VW-Group nomenclature.

References

Porsche